Thomas Blomeyer (born 24 April 1996) is a German professional footballer who most recently played as a defender for Austria Klagenfurt.

Career
Blomeyer signed for MSV Duisburg for the 2016–17 season and made his 3. Liga debut on 13 August 2016 against Mainz 05 II. On 9 May 2018, he re-signed with Duisburg for two more years, which tied him at the club until 2020.

On 29 January 2019, he was loaned out to Sportfreunde Lotte until the end of the 2019–20 season.

On 2 September 2019, Blomeyer joined Austria Klagenfurt on a season-long contract with an option for another year.

References

External links

1996 births
Living people
People from Freising
Sportspeople from Upper Bavaria
German footballers
Footballers from Bavaria
Association football defenders
2. Bundesliga players
3. Liga players
Regionalliga players
2. Liga (Austria) players
FC Ingolstadt 04 players
FC Ingolstadt 04 II players
MSV Duisburg players
Sportfreunde Lotte players
SK Austria Klagenfurt players
Expatriate footballers in Austria
German expatriate sportspeople in Austria
German expatriate footballers